Rachel A. Segalman is the Edward Noble Kramer Professor and Department Chair of Chemical Engineering at University of California, Santa Barbara (UCSB). Her laboratory works on semiconducting block polymers, polymeric ionic liquids, and hybrid thermoelectric materials. She is the associated director of the Center for Materials for Water Energy System, an associate editor of ACS Macro Letters, and co-editor of the Annual Review of Chemical and Biomolecular Engineering.

Early life and education 
Segalman was born in 1975 in Madison, Wisconsin. Her family moved to Albuquerque, New Mexico, where as a high schooler she did research at Sandia National Laboratories. She is a third generation female chemical scientist.

Segalman studied chemical engineering at University of Texas at Austin (UT). She graduate with a bachelor's degree in chemical engineering in 1998. She moved UCSB for her graduate studies, where she received her Ph.D. in 2002. At UCSB she worked under the supervision of Edward J. Kramer. Her research thesis was on controlling long range order in block copolymer thin films. After completing her Ph.D., Segalman was a Chateaubriand postdoctoral fellow at the Ecole Européenne de Chimie, Polymères et Matériaux working under Georges Hadziioannou.

Research and career 
In 2004 Segalman was appointed as the Charles Wilke Assistant Professor of Chemical Engineering at University of California, Berkeley, and a Faculty Research scientist at Lawrence Berkeley National Laboratory (LBL) Materials Science Division. In 2013 she was appointed as the acting director of LBL Materials Science Division.

Segalman was recruited to UCSB in 2014 as the Kramer Professor of Materials in the Departments of Chemical Engineering and Materials. The same year she was also appointed as the chair of the Department of Chemical Engineering and Warren and Katherine Schlinger Professor of Chemical Engineering. She is the associated director of the Center for Materials for Water Energy System, a joint center between UCSB, LBL, and UT funded by the Department of Energy.

Segalman's research focuses on understanding and controlling the self-assembly, structure, and properties of functional polymers. Her laboratory studies polymeric materials for applications such as thermoelectrics, photovoltaics, and anti-fouling coating for ships.

Awards and honors 
 2021 Elected member of the National Academy of Engineering
 2019 Elected member of the American Academy of Arts and Sciences
 2018 Elected Board of Directors, Materials Research Society
 2016 Elected Fellow of the American Physical Society
 2015 Journal of Polymer Science Innovation Award
 2012 John H. Dillon Medal of the American Physical Society
 2009 Alfred P. Sloan Fellow
 2008 Presidential Early Career Award for Scientists and Engineers (PECASE)
 2007 TR35: Technology Review's Top Innovators Under 35
 2006 3M Untenured Faulty Award
 2005 NSF CAREER Award

References 

1975 births
Living people
American materials scientists
University of California, Santa Barbara faculty
University of Texas at Austin alumni
Fellows of the American Physical Society
Fellows of the American Academy of Arts and Sciences
Members of the United States National Academy of Engineering
Annual Reviews (publisher) editors
Women materials scientists and engineers